In mathematics, a rational monoid is a monoid, an algebraic structure, for which each element can be represented in a "normal form" that can be computed by a finite transducer: multiplication in such a monoid is "easy", in the sense that it can be described by a rational function.

Definition
Consider a monoid M.  Consider a pair (A,L) where A is a finite subset of M that generates M as a monoid, and L is a language on A (that is, a subset of the set of all strings A∗).  Let φ be the map from the free monoid A∗ to M given by evaluating a string as a product in M.  We say that L is a rational cross-section if φ induces a bijection between L and M.  We say that (A,L) is a rational structure for M if in addition the kernel of φ, viewed as a subset of the product monoid A∗×A∗ is a rational set.

A quasi-rational monoid is one for which L is a rational relation: a rational monoid is one for which there is also a rational function cross-section of L.  Since L is a subset of a free monoid, Kleene's theorem holds and a rational function is just one that can be instantiated by a finite state transducer.

Examples
 A finite monoid is rational.
 A group is a rational monoid if and only if it is finite.
 A finitely generated free monoid is rational.
 The monoid M4 generated by the set {0,e, a,b, x,y} subject to relations in which e is the identity, 0 is an absorbing element, each of a and b commutes with each of x and y and ax = bx, ay = by = bby, xx = xy = yx = yy = 0 is rational but not automatic.
 The Fibonacci monoid, the quotient of the free monoid on two generators {a,b}∗ by the congruence aab = bba.

Green's relations
The Green's relations for a rational monoid satisfy D = J.

Properties
Kleene's theorem holds for rational monoids: that is, a subset is a recognisable set if and only if it is a rational set.

A rational monoid is not necessarily automatic, and vice versa.  However, a rational monoid is asynchronously automatic and hyperbolic.

A rational monoid is a regulator monoid and a quasi-rational monoid: each of these implies that it is a Kleene monoid, that is, a monoid in which Kleene's theorem holds.

References

 
 
 
 
 

Algebraic structures
Semigroup theory